Ferdinand Porsche (1875–1951) was an automotive engineer and founder of the Porsche car company.

Ferdinand Porsche may also refer to:

 Ferdinand Anton Ernst Porsche (1909–1998), known as Ferry, automobile designer and businessman, son of Ferdinand Porsche, Sr.
 Ferdinand Alexander Porsche (1935–2012), nicknamed Butzi, automobile designer, creator of the Porsche 911, son of Ferry Porsche
 Ferdinand Oliver Porsche (born 1961), German lawyer and businessman, son of Ferdinand Alexander Porsche

See also 

 Porsche family
 Ferdinand (disambiguation)
 Porsche (disambiguation)